G20 protests may refer to:
 2009 G20 London summit protests
 2010 G20 Toronto summit protests
 2017 G20 Hamburg summit protests